Abacetus distinctus is a species of ground beetle in the subfamily Pterostichinae. It was described by Chaudoir in 1878.

References

distinctus
Beetles described in 1878